Al-Jeshah is a village in Al-Ahsa in Saudi Arabia and one of Al-Ahsa eastern villages. It is located about 12 km from Al-Hofuf.

See also
Al-Ahsa

References 

Geography of Saudi Arabia